This is a list of animated television series first aired in 1997.

See also
 List of animated feature films of 1997
 List of Japanese animation television series of 1997

References

Television series
Animated series
1997
1997
1996-related lists